Leidy Natalia Muñoz Ruiz (born 4 June 1985) is a Colombian racing cyclist. She won the Colombian National Road Race Championships in 2015.

Major results
Source: 

2010
 3rd  Team pursuit, Pan American Track Championships
2015
 1st  Road race, National Road Championships
 5th Overall Vuelta a Cundinamarca
2018
 4th Overall Vuelta Femenina a Guatemala
1st Mountains classification
2019
 3rd Overall Vuelta a Colombia Femenina
1st Points classification
1st Stages 3 & 5

References

External links

1985 births
Living people
Colombian female cyclists
Place of birth missing (living people)
20th-century Colombian women
21st-century Colombian women